Gerakari is a village in the Rethymno regional unit of Crete. It is in a mountainous area below Mount Kedros.

It lies 35 kilometres south of the city of Rethymno. It is located on the E4 European Path.

Populated places in Rethymno (regional unit)